Big Biz Tycoon 2 is a business simulation game centered on the business world. Similar to other games in this genre, the player aims to become a mogul of an industry. It was developed for Microsoft Windows by 4HEAD Studios, and published by Activision Value.

Gameplay 
The objective of the game is to create a successful business by developing and creating products. For selling them, the player earns money, which enables him to hire employees and decorate the office building. These workers can be assigned to projects according to their strengths, and must then develop and market a product.

Reception

GameSpot critic gave the game a 3.7/10 while the 29 users gave an average of 5.8.

See also
Big Biz Tycoon

External links 
 Gamezone: Big Biz Tycoon 2 Description

References

2003 video games
Activision games
Business simulation games
Video game sequels
Video games developed in Germany
Windows games
Windows-only games